Siarhei Vladimirovich Novikau, sometimes spelled Sergey Novikov, is a Belarusian professional boxer. As an amateur he won a bronze medal at the 2013 European Championships.

In 2018 Siarhei Novikau started his professional career.

Amateur career
Siarhei Novikau competed at the 2013 AIBA World Boxing Championships. He was also part of the Belarus team at the 2015 European Games in Baku and at the 2016 European Boxing Olympic Qualification Tournament in April 2016 for qualified for the 2016 Summer Olympics.

Siarhei Novikau won the bronze medal at the 2013 European Amateur Boxing Championships in Minsk.

Professional boxing record

References

External links

Year of birth missing (living people)
Date of birth missing (living people)
Living people
Belarusian male boxers
European Games competitors for Belarus
Boxers at the 2015 European Games
Light-heavyweight boxers
Heavyweight boxers
Sportspeople from Minsk